Perieți may refer to several places in Romania:

 Perieți, Ialomița, a commune in Ialomița County
 Perieți, Olt, a commune in Olt County